Ghatawan (also spelled Ghataon) is a large village in the western part of Kudra block, in Kaimur district, Bihar, India. As of 2011, its population was 9,997, in 1,551 households.

References 

Villages in Kaimur district